Mycetosoritis is a genus of fungus-growing ants in the subfamily Formicinae.

Species
 Mycetosoritis aspera (Mayr, 1887)
 Mycetosoritis clorindae (Kusnezov, 1949)
 Mycetosoritis explicata Kempf, 1968
 Mycetosoritis hartmanni (Wheeler, 1907)
 Mycetosoritis vinsoni Mackay, 1998

References

External links

Formicinae
Ant genera